This is a list of the first women lawyer(s) and judge(s) in Europe. It includes the year in which the women were admitted to practice law (in parentheses). Also included are the first women in their country to achieve a certain distinction such as obtaining a law degree.

KEY
 CYP = Partially recognized state in Cyprus
 DNK = Constituent country of Denmark
 FIN = Autonomous administrative division of Finland
 GBR = British overseas territory of the United Kingdom
 MDA = Territorial unit and de facto independent state of Moldova
 NOR = Unincorporated area of Norway
 SRB = Partially recognized state in Serbia

Albania 
 Erifili Bezhani (1952): First Albanian female lawyer. She graduated and practiced law in France before being convicted by Albania's Communist Regime.
 Natasha Sheshi: First female to serve as a Judge of the Constitutional Court of Albania (1992)
 Ina Rama (b. 1972): First female to serve as the Prosecutor General of Albania (2007-2012)
 : First female justice appointed as the Chief Justice of the Supreme Court of Albania (2008-2013)
 Vitore Tushë: First female to serve as the Acting President of the Constitutional Court of Albania (2019)

Andorra 
 Rosa Ferràndiz: First (female) notary in Andorra (1998)
 Sonia Artal Conesa (2013): First female lawyer of Spanish nationality to practice in Andorra
 Maria Teresa Armengol Bonet: First female to serve as a member of the Superior Council of Justice of Andorra (2005)
 Laurence Burgogue-Larsen: First female appointed as a Judge of the Constitutional Court of Andorra (2012)

Austria 

 Marianne Beth (1889-1984) (1922): First female lawyer in Austria
 Johanna Kundmann and Gertrude Jaklin (née Sollinger): First female judges in Austria (1947)
 Margarete Haimberger-Tanzer (1916-1987): First female to serve as a criminal judge in Austria (1950)
 Gerda Meissl: First female prosecutor in Austria (upon becoming a public prosecutor in Vienna in 1951)
 Lisbeth Lass: First female appointed as a Judge of the Constitutional Court of Austria (1994)
 Irmgard Griss (b. 1946): First female judge to serve as the President of the Supreme Court of Austria (2007-2011)
 Brigitte Bierlein (b. 1949): First female to serve as the Advocate General in the Procurator's Office at the Supreme Court (1990) and President of the Constitutional Court of Austria (2018)

Belarus 
 Olga Filippovna Sukhanova: First female to serve as the Chairperson of the Supreme Court of the BSSR (1936)
 Isabella Martsinovich: First female to earn a Doctor of Laws (1969) and become a law professor (1971) in Belarus
 Lilia Vlasova and Natalia Kozyrenko: First female lawyers to establish a private law practice in post-Soviet Belarus (1990)
 Valentina Ivanovna Miroshnik: First Belarusian female to serve as a Judge of the Economic Court of the Commonwealth of Independent States (1992)
 Rimma Ivanovna Filipchik, Podgrusha Valentina Vasilyevna, and Kenik (Khoma) Ksenia Ivanovna: First females to serve as Judges of the Constitutional Court of Belarus (1994)
 Natalia Iosifovna Andreichik: First female to serve as the President of the Belarusian Republican Bar Association (1997)

Belgium 

 Marie Popelin (1888): First female to earn a doctorate in law in Belgium, but denied the right to practice as a lawyer
 Paule Lemy and Marcelle Renson (1922): The first women who took the oath of lawyer in Belgium
 Geneviève Janssen-Pevtschin (1937): First female judge in Belgium (upon her appointment as a Judge of the Brussels Court of First Instance in 1948)
 Cecile Draps: First female appointed as a lawyer at the Court of Cassation of Belgium (1980)
 Mrs. Virlee (first name unknown): First female to serve as the Chairperson of a Bar Association (upon becoming the Chairperson of the Dinant Bar in 1980)
 Irène Pétry: First female to serve as a Judge (1984) and President (1991) of the Court of Arbitration of Belgium (Francophone Group) [renamed as the Constitutional Court of Belgium in 2007]
 : First female appointed as an Attorney General for a Belgian Court of Appeal (upon her appointment to the Liège Court of Appeal in 1996)
 Beatrijs Deconinck: First female justice to serve as the First President of the Court of Cassation of Belgium (2019)

Bosnia and Herzegovina
 Mira Gavrilovich: First female lawyer and judge in Bosnia and Herzegovina when the country was part of Yugoslavia
 Azra Omeragić: First female to serve as a Judge of the Constitutional Court of Bosnia and Herzegovina in the post-Dayton period (1998)
 Meddžida Kreso: First female to serve as a Judge and President of the Court of Bosnia and Herzegovina (2004)
 Gordana Tadic: First female to serve as the Chief State Prosecutor of Bosnia and Herzegovina (2019)

Bulgaria 
 Vera Zlatareva (1945): First female lawyer in Bulgaria
 Neviana Hristova: First female lawyer to become a prosecutor in Bulgaria (1953)
 Milena Zhabinska: First female to serve as a Judge of Constitutional Court of the Republic of Bulgaria (1991-1994)
 Yordanka Hadzhineva: First female to serve as a member of the Supreme Judicial Council of Bulgaria (1991)
 Snezhana Botusharova: First female elected in respect of Bulgaria to serve as a Judge of the European Court of Human Rights (1998-2008)
 Anya Dimova: First female appointed as the Appellate Prosecutor of the Supreme Judicial Council of Bulgaria (2004)
 Tsanka Tsankova: First female to serve temporarily as the Chairperson of the Constitutional Court of the Republic of Bulgaria (2012-2013)
 Galina Zaharova: First female to serve as the Chairperson of the Supreme Court of Cassation of Bulgaria (2022)

Channel Islands
 Sarah Kelly (1997): First female advocate appointed Greffier to the Jurats of Alderney (2005–2012)
 Jessica Roland: First female to serve as a Deputy Bailiff in Guernsey (2019)
 Anita Sarella Regal: First female admitted as an advocate of the Royal Court of Jersey (1968)
 Barbara Myles: First female (non-attorney) jurat in Jersey (1980–2001)

Croatia 
 Mara Ilić (1929): First female lawyer in Croatia
 Miroslava Vekić and Erika Kocijančić: First females to serve as Judges of the Supreme Court of Croatia upon the court's creation in 1990
 Emilija Rajić (1973) and Jasna Omejec (1985): First females to serve as Judges of the Constitutional Court of Croatia (1999)
 Jasna Omejec (1985): First female to serve as the Constitutional Court of Croatia's President (2008-2016).
 Branka Ćiraković: First female to serve as the Acting President of the High Commercial Court of the Republic of Croatia (2008)
 Tamara Laptoš: First female to serve as the Director of the Office for the Suppression of Corruption and Organized Crime (a specialized body within the State's Attorney Office of the Republic of Croatia; 2014)
 Zlata Hrvoj-Šipek: First female to serve as the Attorney General of the State's Attorney Office of the Republic of Croatia (2020)

Cyprus 
 Stella Soulioti (1951): First female lawyer in Cyprus. She later became the first female Attorney General of Cyprus.
 Gönül Başaran Erönen (1975): First female judge in Cyprus (upon her appointment as a Judge of the District Court of Cyprus in 1980)
 Efi Papadopoulou (1970): First female appointed as a Justice of the Supreme Court of Cyprus (2004)
 Persephone Panagi: First female to serve as the President of the Supreme Court of Cyprus (2020)

Czech Republic 
 Anděla Kozáková-Jírová (1923): First female to obtain a legal diploma in the Czech Republic (later first female notary)
 Matylda Mocová-Wíchová (1928): First female lawyer in the Czech Republic
 Anny Maass (1938) is identified as the first woman lawyer, but was stripped of her right to practice law due to her Jewish background.
 Zdeňka Patschová: First female judge in the 1930s when the country was a part of Czechoslovakia
 Viera Strážnická: First female to serve as a Judge of the Constitutional Court of the Czech and Slovak Federal Republic (1991-1992)
 Iva Brozova, Eva Zarembová, and Ivana Janů: First females appointed as Judges of the Constitutional Court of the Czech Republic respectively (1993)
 Ivana Janů: First female to serve as the Vice President of the Constitutional Court of the Czech Republic. 
 Kateřina Hornochová: First female to serve as a Judge of the Supreme Court of the Czech Republic when the court was restructured in 1993
 Bohumíra Kopečná: First female to serve as the Supreme Public Prosecutor of the Czech Republic (1994)
 Eliška Wagnerová: First female to serve as the President of the Constitutional Court of the Czech Republic (1998-2002)
 Michaela Bejčková, Miluše Došková, Lenka Kaniová, Lenka Matyášová, Milada Tomková, Eliška Cihlářová, Brigita Chrastilová, Dagmar Nygrínová, Marie Souckova, Marie Turkova, Ludmila Valentová and Marie Žišková: First females to serve as Judges of the Supreme Administrative Court of the Czech Republic (2003)

Denmark 

 Nanna Kristensen-Randers (1887): First female to obtain a legal diploma in Denmark
 Henny Magnussen (1909): First woman to be permitted to work in the high courts of Denmark. Nanna Kristensen-Randers, who received a legal diploma in 1887, was not authorized to work in the country's high courts but was restricted to the lower courts.
 Elisa Ussing (1909): First female temporarily appointed as a Judge in the Østre Landsret (One of the high courts of Denmark; 1933). She was officially appointed to the aforementioned court in 1939.
 Ragnhild Fabricius Gjellerup: First female judge in Denmark (1934)
 Ingeborg Hansen: First female lawyer to practice before the Supreme Court of Denmark (1943)
 Bodil Dybdal: First woman appointed as a Justice of the Supreme Court of Denmark (1953)
 Helga Pedersen (1936): First female appointed as a Judge of the Strasbourg Human Rights Court (1971)

Estonia 
 Ilse Zimmermann (1922): First female to graduate with a law degree in Estonia (1922)
 Margot Viirmann-Kanemägi: First female member of the Estonian Bar Association (1924), though she was not officially registered as a lawyer until 1932
 Auguste Susi-Tannebaum and Olli Olesk: First females to apply for judicial positions, but were ultimately rejected (1924–1929) 
 Hilda Reimann and Marta Kurfeldt (1930): First female lawyers in Estonia 
 Lyubov Hütsi: First female to serve in a judicial capacity in Estonia (1936) [upon being elected as the Chairman of the Tartu Orphans' Court]
 Lea Kivi and Triinu Vernik: First females appointed as Judges of the Supreme Court of the Republic of Estonia (1993)

Faroe Islands (DNK) 

 Marita Petersen is referred to as the first female lawyer in the Faroe Islands by various sources. She may have actually been a lagman or lawspeaker, which is a Scandinavian legal office.

Finland 
 Agnes Lundell (1911): First female lawyer in Finland
 Katri Hakkila: First female judge in Finland (c. 1930s)
 Lemmikki Kekomäki (1927): First female appointed as a Judge of the Supreme Administrative Court of Finland (1958)
 Inkeri Harmaja (1930): First female lawyer to receive the honorary title varatuomari, or vicehäradshövding in Finland
 Maarit Saarni-Rytkölä (1943): First female appointed as a Justice of the Supreme Court of Finland (1949)
 Ritva Hyöky (1944): First female appointed as a President of a Court of Appeal in Finland (upon her appointment to the Vaasa Court of Appeal in 1975)
 Inkeri Anttila (1946): First female doctor of law and first female professor of law in Finland (upon her appointment as Professor of Criminal Law at the University of Helsinki in 1961)
 Pauliine Koskelo (1979): First female justice appointed as the President of the Supreme Court of Finland (2005)
 Raija Toiviainen: First female to serve as the Deputy Prosecutor General (2016-2018) and Prosecutor General (2018- ) of Finland
 Tuula Linna: First female to serve as President of the Finnish Bar Association (2019)

France 

 Victorie de Villirouët (1798): First female to act as an attorney in court during the French Revolution
 Sarmiza Bilcescu (1887): First female to graduate with a law degree in France
 Olga Petit and Jeanne Chauvin (1900): First female lawyers in France. Chauvin would be the first female lawyer to actually plead a case before the French court.
 Maria Vérone (1906): First female lawyer to plead before a French assize court (1908)
 Mme. Valat: First female lawyer to plead a case before a French military court (1913)
 Paule Godinot: First female to serve as a Commissioner-in-waiting in France (1928)
 Paule-René Pignet: First female to serve as the president of a bar association in France (1933)
 Marguerite Haller and Charlotte Béquignon-Lagarde: First female judges in France (1946). They later became the first females to serve as President of the Conflict Court and preside over a French assize court respectively in France (1962 and 1964).
 Jacqueline Bauchet and Louise Cadoux: First females to serve as members of the Council of State (France) (1953)
 Simone Veil: First female to serve as the Secretary General of the Supreme Council of Magistracy (1970)
 Marcelle Pipien: First female to serve as the President of an Administrative Court in France (1973)
 Marie-Thérèse Goutmann: First female to sit on the High Court of Justice of France (1974)
 Martine Luc-Thaler (1976): First female lawyer in the State Council and the Court of Cassation of France
 Suzanne Challe: First female to serve as the President of a Court of Appeal in France (1978)
 Suzanne Bastid: First female to sit among the members of the International Court of Justice for oral proceedings (1982)
 Simone Rozès (1945): First female justice appointed as the President of the Court of Cassation of France (1984-1988)
 Noëlle Lenoir: First female appointed as a Judge of the Constitutional Council of France (1992) 
 Sarah Tournier: First female appointed as a Judge of the Commercial Court of France (2018)
 Christiane Féral-Schuhl: First female to serve as the President of the National Bar Council (2018-2020)

Germany 

 Anita Augsburg (1897): First woman to earn her Doctor of Law in 1897 in Germany, though she was not allowed to practice law until after the law changed in 1922.
 Maria Otto (1922): First female lawyer in Germany
 Maria Hagemeyer (1924): First female judge in Germany (1927-1928) after having served as an Assessor in Prussia
 Erna Scheffler (1925): First female to serve as a Judge of the German Federal Constitutional Court (1951)
 Gisela Niemeyer (c. 1950s): First female appointed as a Justice of the Supreme Court of Finances in the German Federal Republic (1973) and Judge of the Federal Constitutional Court (1977)
 Jutta Limbach (c. 1962): First female appointed as the President of the Federal Constitutional Court of Germany (1994-2002)
 Ninon Colneric: First female judge from Germany to sit on the European Court of Justice (2000)
 Monika Harms (c. 1970s): First female appointed as the Attorney General of Germany (2006-2011)
 Bettina Limperg: First female to serve as the President of the Federal (Supreme) Court of Germany (2014)
 Ulrike Paul: First female to serve as a member of the BRAK Presidium (2015)
 Edith Kindermann (1992): First female lawyer to serve as the President of the German Bar Association (2019)

Gibraltar (GBR) 
 Pamela Benady (1955): First female barrister (who was of Jewish descent) in Gibraltar
 Dorothy Ellicott: First female Justice of the Peace in Gibraltar (1970)
 Karen Ramagge Prescott (1988): First female judge (a Gibraltarian) in Gibraltar (upon her appointment as a Puisne Justice of the Supreme Court of Gibraltar in 2010). She later became the first female Bencher of the Middle Temple (2017). 
 Gillian Guzman (1994): First female Queen's Counsel (QC) in Gibraltar (2012)
 Janet Smith (1972): First female appointed as a Judge of the Gibraltar Court of Appeal (2017)

Greece 
 Efharis Petridou (1925): First female lawyer in Greece (upon registering with the Athens Bar Association)
 Penelope Athanasopoulou: First female judge in Greece [upon her appointment as a Judge of the Council of State (Supreme Administrative Court) of Greece in 1958]
 Anna Athanasiadou: First female areopagite in Greece (upon her appointment to the Supreme Civil and Criminal Court of Greece in 1980)
 Athanasia Tsampasi: First female to serve as Vice-President of the Council of State (Supreme Administrative Court) of Greece (2004)
 Rena Asimakopoulou (1969): First female to serve as President of the Supreme Civil and Criminal Court of Greece (2011)
 Eleni Diakomanoli: First female to serve as the General State Commissioner of the Administrative Courts of Greece (2011)
 Efterpi Kutzamani: First female appointed as the Prosecutor of the Supreme Civil and Criminal Court of Greece (2013)
 Aikaterini Sakellaropoulou: First female to serve as the President of the Council of State (Supreme Administrative Court) of Greece (2018)

Hungary 
 Ilonka Hajnal: First female to study law in Hungary (1913)
 Irén Svábyné (Priegl): First female to earn a Juris Doctor and become a lawyer candidate in Hungary (1925). She died before she could achieve her goal. 
 Margit Ungár (1928): First female lawyer in Hungary [she practiced law in Budapest, Central Hungary]
 Magda Bernauer (1948): First female to pass the patent attorney exam and receive a patent attorney license in Hungary
 Istvánné Pomázi: First female judge in Hungary (c. 1948)
 : First female appointed as a Judge of the Constitutional Court of Hungary (1999)

Iceland 
 Auður Auðuns (1935): First female lawyer in Iceland. She was also the first female to earn a law degree from the University of Iceland.
 Rannveig Þorsteinsdóttir: First female to practice law before the Supreme Court of Iceland (1959)
 Auður Þorbergsdóttir: First female judge in Iceland (1963)
 Guðrún Erlendsdóttir: First female appointed as a Judge of the Supreme Court of Iceland (c. 1986) and its President (c. 1991)

Ireland 
 Frances Kyle and Averil Deverell (1921): First female barristers admitted to the Irish Bar [Ireland]
 Mary Dorothea Heron and Helena Early (1923): First female solicitors in Ireland
 Frances Moran (1924): First female to take silk and become a senior counsel in Ireland (1941)
 Lady Arnott, Lady Redmond, Lady Dockrell, and Miss Palles: First women appointed as Justices of the Peace in Ireland (1920)
 Eileen Kennedy (1947): First female judge in Ireland (1964)
 Moya Quinlan (1946): First female to serve as President of the Law Society of Ireland (1968)
 Susan Denham (1971): First female appointed as a Justice of the Supreme Court of Ireland (1992) and serve and its Chief Justice (2011-2017)
 Mella Carroll (1976; Northern Ireland Bar): First female appointed as a Judge of the High Court of Ireland (1980)
 Catherine McGuinness (1977): First female appointed as a Judge of the Circuit Court of Ireland (1994)
 Katherine Delahunt-O'Byrnes (1979): First female solicitor appointed as a Judge of the Circuit Court of Ireland (2001)
 Claire Loftus: First female to serve as the Director of Public Prosecutions in Ireland (2011)
 Máire Whelan (1985) First female appointed as Attorney General (2011)
 Síofra O'Leary: First (Irish) female to serve as the President of the European Court of Human Rights (2022)

Isle of Man 
 Clare Faulds (1973): First female admitted to the Manx Bar in the Isle of Man (Crown dependency). She was later appointed as a Senior Magistrate for the Falkland Islands and South Georgia and the South Sandwich Islands (2004–2008, 2014–2016).
 Sharon Roberts: First female to serve as the President of the Isle of Man Law Society (2007)
 Jayne Hughes: First female Deputy High Bailiff of the Isle of Man (2011). She later became High Bailiff in 2019.

Italy 
 Giustina Rocca: First female to act as a lawyer in an Italian court (1500)
 Lidia Poët (1883): First female lawyer in Italy
 Teresa Labriola: First female lawyer in Italy to practice law
 Letizia De Martino, Ada Lepore, Maria Gabriella Luccioli, Graziana Calcagno Pini, Raffaella D’Antonio, Annunziata Izzo, Giulia De Marco and Emilia Capelli: First female judges in Italy (1965). Luccioli later became the first female President of the Chamber of Cassation of Italy (2008).
 Fernanda Contri: First female to be appointed as a Judge of the Constitutional Court of Italy (1996) and serve as its Vice-President (2005)
 Lucia Serena Rossi: First Italian female to serve as a Judge of the Court of Justice of the European Union (2017)
 Marta Cartabia: First female to serve as the President of the Constitutional Court of Italy (2019) 
 Margherita Cassano: First female to serve as the Vice-President of the Supreme Court of Cassation of Italy (2020)

Kosovo 
 Nekibe Kelmendi (1974): First female (of Albanian descent) lawyer in Kosovo
 : First female judge in Kosovo (1974-1979)
 Bademe Siqani Sllamnikut: First female prosecutor in Kosovo
 Gjyljeta Mushkolaj, Iliriana Islami, and Snezhana Botusharova: First females elected as Judges of the Constitutional Court of the Republic of Kosovo (2009)
 Arta Rama-Hajrizi: First female to serve as the President of the Constitutional Court of the Republic of Kosovo (2015)

Latvia 
 Otīlija Ķempele: First female lawyer in Latvia
 Rozālija Purgale (1932): First female judge in Latvia (1933) 
 Anita Ušacka, Ilmu Cepani, and Ilze Skultans: First females appointed as Judges of the Constitutional Court of Latvia (1996)
 Aija Branta: First female to serve as the Chairperson of the Constitutional Court of Latvia (2014)

Liechtenstein 
 Gertrud Beck (1956): First female lawyer in Liechtenstein
 Brigette Feger and Hilda Korner: First females to serve as Judges of the Constitutional Court of the Principality of Liechtenstein (1985)

Lithuania 
 Liuda Vienožinskaitė-Purėnienė (1917): First female lawyer in Lithuania
 Elena Jackevičaitė: First female judge in Lithuania (1924)
 Teodora Staugaitienė: First female to serve as a Judge of the Constitutional Court of Lithuania (1993)
 Nida Grunskienė: First female to serve as the Prosecutor General of Lithuania (2021)

Luxembourg 
 Marguerite Welter (1923): First female admitted to the Luxembourg Bar, though she ultimately did not practice law
 Netty Probst (1927): First female lawyer to actually practice law in Luxembourg. She was also the first female to serve as the Bâtonnière of the Luxembourg Bar Association (1954-1956). 
 Marthe Glesener: First female to apply to become a magistrate in Luxembourg, but was denied (1937) 
 Anne-Marie Courte, Claire Peters and Jeanne Rouff: First females to serve as magistrates in Luxembourg (1961). Rouff later became the first female to serve as a state prosecutor in Luxembourg, as well as the first female President of the Chamber of the Court of Appeals of Luxembourg. 
 Paulette Lenert: First female to serve as a judge and the Deputy Chairperson of the Administrative Court of Luxembourg (1997–2010) 
 Chantal Arens: First French (female) magistrate to serve on the Luxembourg Court of Justice 
 Martine Solovieff: First female appointed as the State Attorney General of Luxembourg (2015)

Malta 
 Joanna Digiorgio (1949): First female lawyer in Malta
 Lorraine Schembri Orland: First female elected to Chambers of Advocates of Malta (1986) and Judge of the European Court of Human Rights (2019)
 Ena Cremona (1959): First Maltese judge (and female) to serve on the European Court of First Instance in Luxembourg upon the country's accession to the European Union in 2004
 Abigail Lofaro and Anna Felice: First female judges in Malta

Moldova 
 Eugenia Cruşevan (1918): First female lawyer in Moldova [when the country was known as Bessarabia]
 Elena Safaleru: First female to serve as a Judge of the Constitutional Court of Moldova (2001)
 Alina Ianucenco: First female (a lawyer and former judge) ombudsman for the Moldovan People's Advocate Office

Monaco 
 Laurence Aureglia (1959): First female lawyer in Monaco
 Ariane Picco-Margossian: First female magistrate in Monaco (upon her appointment as a deputy judge in 1970)
 Monique François: First Monegasque female magistrate appointed as the First President of the Court of Appeal of the Principality of Monaco

Montenegro 
An unknown woman became the first female judge in Montenegro in 1954. She had served in the Basic Court.

 Julija (Julia) Jovanova Lazović: First female to earn a university (law) degree in Montenegro (1906) 
 Ksenija Raičević: First female appointed as a Judge of the Constitutional Court of Montenegro 
 Emilija Durutović: First female to serve as a Justice of the Supreme Court of Montenegro
 Vesna Medenica: First female appointed as a state prosecutor in Montenegro, as well as the first female President of the Supreme Court of Montenegro (c. 2016)

Netherlands 

 Elisabeth van Dorp (1899): First female to earn a law degree in the Netherlands, but she did not practice as an attorney
 Adolphine Kok (1903): First female lawyer in the Netherlands
 Johanna Clementina Hudig (1934): First female judge in the Netherlands (1947)
 A.A.L. "Guusje" Minkenhof (c. 1940s): First female advocate general (1966) and first female counselor (1967) at the Supreme Court of the Netherlands
 Dien Korvinus (1964): First female appointed as the Attorney General of the Netherlands (1970-1999)
 PMA de Groot-van Dijken: First female to serve as the Chairperson of a Bar Association in the Netherlands (upon becoming the Chairperson of the Young Bar Association in Utrecht in 1977)
 Winnie Sorgdrager: First female chief prosecutor of any court in the Netherlands (1994)
 Els Unger: First female to serve as the Dean of the Dutch Bar Association [Nederlandse orde van advocaten] (2005)
 Dineke de Groot: First female to serve as the President of the Supreme Court of the Netherlands (2020)

North Macedonia 
 Gordana Dimitrovska Hristovska Takesz (1983): First female lawyer in North Macedonia [specifically in Bitola, Pelagonia Region, North Macedonia]
 Alma Mustafovska-Salimovska: First Roma female lawyer (now registered with the Bar Association of North Macedonia) in the former country of Yugoslavia
 Branka Ciriviri-Antonovska: First female to serve as a Judge of the Constitutional Court of North Macedonia (1984)
 Margarita Caca Nikolovska: First Macedonian (female) to serve as a Judge at the European Court of Human Rights in Strasbourg (1998)
 Liljana Ingilizova-Ristova: First female to serve as the President of the Constitutional Court of North Macedonia (2003)
 Lidija Nedelkova: First female appointed as the President of the Supreme Court of North Macedonia (2012)

Northern Cyprus (CYP) 
 Shefika Hassan Hilmi Durduran (c. 1970s): First Turkish Cypriot woman to have registered to practice law in Northern Cyprus
 Gönül Başaran Erönen (1975): First female appointed as a Justice of the Northern Cyprus Supreme Court (1994)
 Emine Dizdarlı: First female Ombudsman of Northern Cyprus (2015)

Norway 
 Maren Cathrine Dahl (1890): First female in Norway to earn a law degree, but did not practice as an attorney
 Elise Sem (1904): First female lawyer in Norway
 Ruth Sörenson: First female judge in Norway (1913)
 Lilly Bǿlviken (1942): First female appointed as a Justice of the Supreme Court of Norway (1968)
 Ellen Holager Andenǽs: First female lawyer to become a state prosecutor in Norway (1983)
 Toril Marie Ǿie (1986): First female justice appointed as the Chief Justice of the Supreme Court of Norway (2016)

Poland 
 Janina Podgórska-Jurkiewiczowa: First Polish female admitted as an assistant to a sworn attorney (her admission occurred in the Russian Empire in 1908)
 Blanka Morgenstern, Irena Kaliska, Szaja Frenkel, and Irena Brodzińska: First female law students in Poland (upon their admittance to the University of Warsaw in 1915)
 Helena Kononowicz-Wiewiórska (1925): First female lawyer in Poland
 Wanda Grabińska-Wójtowicz (1925): First female judge in Poland (upon her appointment to the Division XXII for juvenile cases in 1929)
 Izabela Chojecka-Boniecka: First female prosecutor in pre-war Poland (1936)
 Zofia Gawrońska-Wasilkowska: First female to serve as a Judge of the Supreme Court of Poland (1948)
 Maria Szabłowska and Irena Śmietanka-Szwaczkowska: First females to serve as Judges of the Supreme Administrative Court of Poland (1980)
 Maria Teresa Budzanowska: First female to serve as the Vice President of the Polish Bar Council (1979). She was also the first female to serve as the President of its Supreme Bar Council (1983).
 Natalia Gajl: First female elected as a Judge of the Constitutional Tribunal (Poland) (1985)
 Ewa Łętowska: First (female) appointed as the Ombudsman for Citizen Rights in Poland (1988)
 Małgorzata Gersdorf First female to serve as the First President of the Supreme Court of Poland (2014)
 Julia Przyłębska: First female to serve as the President of the Constitutional Tribunal of the Republic of Poland (2016)

Portugal 
 Regina Quintelitza (1913): First female lawyer in Portugal
 Cândida Almeida: First female magistrate in Portugal (c. 1971)
 Ruth Garcês (1954): First female judge in Portugal (1977)
 Maria da Assunção Esteves (c. 1989): First female judge to serve on the Portuguese Constitutional Council (1989-1998), as well as become the first female President of the Assembly of the Republic (2011)
 Maria de Jesus Serra Lopes: First female to serve as the President of the Portuguese Bar Association (1990)
 Isabel Jovita Loureiro dos Santos Macedo:  First female appointed as a Judge of the Supreme Administrative Court of Portugal (c. 1997)

 Isabel Marques da Silva: First female appointed as a President Judge of the Supreme Administrative Court of Portugal (2009)
 Joana Marques Vidal (c. 1978): First female appointed as the Attorney General of Portugal (2012)
 Maria Lúcia Amaral: First female to serve as the Vice-President of the Constitutional Court of Portugal (2012) and Ombudsman for Portugal (2017)
 Maria dos Prazeres Beleza: First female justice to serve as the Vice-President of the Supreme Court of Justice of Portugal (2018)
 Dulce Manuel da Conceição Neto: First female judge to serve as the President of the Supreme Administrative Court of Portugal (2019)

Romania 
 Sarmiza Bilcescu (1891): First female to register with the Romanian Bar, but did not practice as an attorney [Romania]
 Ella Negruzzi (1913): First female lawyer in Romania to actually practice 
 Veronica Zosin Gorgos: First female prosecutor (1944) and magistrate in Romania (of Jewish descent)
 Yolanda Eminescu (1943), Sanda Rosetti, and Steliana Popescu: First female judges in Romania (1945)
 Carmen Thea Kahane: First female military prosecutor of Romania
 Aspazia Cojocaru: First female appointed as a Judge of the Constitutional Court of Romania (2004)
 Laura Codruța Kövesi: First female Attorney General of Romania (2006-2012)
 Lidia Bărbulescu: First female judge to serve as the President of the High Court of Cassation and Justice of Romania (2009)
 Simina Avram: First female military magistrate in Romania (2011)

Russia 

 Anna Evreinova (1873): First woman in Russia to earn a doctorate in law (awarded in Germany by Leipzig University)
 Elizaveta Fedoseevna "E.F." Kozmina: First female to practice law in Russia (c. 1871). Despite passing a required exam by 1875, her legal practice ended when the Minister of Justice forbade women to act as attorneys in 1876.
 Katarina Abramovna Fleyshyts (1909): First certified female lawyer in the Russian Empire
 Mukhlisa Bubi: First female judge (Muslim qadi) in the Russian Empire (1917)
 : First female judge in Soviet Russia (1917)
 Faina Efimovna Nyurina and N. A. Gorsheneva: First females to serve as the Acting Prosecutor General of the RSFSR (1936) and Deputy Prosecutor General of the RSFSR respectively
 Tamara Georgievna Morshchakova: First female to serve as a Judge of the Constitutional Court of the Russian Federation (1991)
 Tatiana Nikolaevna Molchanova: First Russian female to serve as a Judge of the Economic Court of the Commonwealth of Independent States (2003)

San Marino
 Rita Palazzetti (1974): First female lawyer who was awarded the notarial seal in San Marino
 Maria Lea Pedini-Angelini: First female to serve as a Captain Regent of the Republic of San Marino (1980)
 Gloria Giardi, Gianna Burgagni, Antonella Annamaria Bonelli, Daniela Della Balda, Anna Maria Lonfemini and Maria Christina Lonfemini (1995): First females to register as members of the Order of Lawyers and Notaries in San Marino (Ordine degli Avvocati e Notai della Repubblica di San Marino)
 Maria Selva: First female to serve as the President of the Order of Lawyers and Notaries in San Marino (2012). She later became the first female Vice President of the Criminal Chamber of San Marino in 2015 (since the Camera Penale di San Marino's establishment in 2014)
 Gianna Burgagni: First female to serve as the President of the Criminal Chamber of San Marino (2016)

Serbia 
 Marija Milutinović Punktatorka (1862): First female lawyer in Serbia
 Katarine Lengold Marinković (1933): First female lawyer registered in the Bar Association of Serbia 
 Leposava Karamarković: First female to serve as President of the Supreme Court of Cassation of the Republic of Serbia (2001-2002)
 Bosa Nenadić: First female to serve as the President of the Constitutional Court of Serbia (2007–2010)
 Nata Mesarović (1974): First female elected as the President of the Supreme Court of Cassation of the Republic of Serbia (2009)

Slovakia 
 Louise Pappova (1925): First female candidate inscribed into the list of advocates in Slovakia
 Alžbeta Cziglerová Wildmann (1931): First female lawyer in Slovakia
 Zdeňka Patschová: First female judge in the 1930s when the country was a part of Czechoslovakia
 Daniela Švecová: First female to serve as the Vice President (2005) and President of the Supreme Court of the Slovak Republic (2014)
 Ivetta Macejková: First female to serve as the Chief Justice of the Constitutional Court of Slovakia (2007)

Slovenia 
 Zora Tominšek (1929) and Zdenka Brejc-Perne (1937): First female lawyers in Slovenia respectively
 Francka Strmole Hlastec: First female to serve as the President of the Supreme Court of Slovenia following independence (1991-1993)
 Miroslava Geč-Korošec (1966): First female appointed as a Judge of the Constitutional Court of Slovenia (1998)
 Dragica Wedam Lukić: First female to serve as the President of the Constitutional Court of Slovenia (2001)
 Mirjam Škrk: First female to serve as the Vice President of the Constitutional Court of Slovenia (2004)
 Zdenka Cerar (c. 1966): First female appointed as the Attorney General of Slovenia (2004)

Spain 

 María Ascensión Chirivella Marín (1921): First female registered in a bar association and to actually practice law in Spain
 Victoria Kent: First female lawyer to defend a litigant at a court martial in Spain (1930)
 Maria Luisa Algarra: First female judge in Spain (1936)
 Elvira Fernández Almoguera Casas: First female prosecutor in Spain (1937)
 Julia Álvarez Resano: First female magistrate in Spain (1938)
 María Luisa Suárez Roldán (1941): First female labor lawyer in Spain 
 María Jóver Carrión: First female district court judge in Spain (1972) 
 Josefina Triguero Agudo: First female appointed as a Judge of First Instance and Instruction after passing the examination (1977) 
 Gloria Begué: First female appointed as a magistrate (1980) and the Vice-President of the Constitutional Court of Spain (1986-1989)
 Milagros Calvo: First female magistrate of the Supreme Court of Spain (Fourth Chamber; 2002) 
 María Emilia Casas: First female to serve as the President of the Constitutional Court of Spain (2004)
 María Eugènia Alegret i Burgués: First female to become President of a Superior Court of Justice in Spain (upon becoming the President of the Superior Court of Justice of Catalonia in 2004)
 Ángela Murillo: First female to serve as a magistrate of the Criminal Chamber of the National Court of Spain and its President (2008)
 Consuelo Madrigal (1980): First female appointed as the Attorney General of Spain (2015-2016)
 Clara Martinez de Careaga (1981): First female appointed as a magistrate of the Military Chamber of the Supreme Court of Spain (2009)
 María Elósegui: First female from Spain appointed as a Judge of the European Court of Human Rights in Strasbourg, France (2018)
 : First Gypsy female lawyer to represent Spain before the European Commission Against Racism and Intolerance (ECRI) (2018)
 Maria Luisa Segoviano Astaburuaga: First female to become president of a chamber of the High Court (upon becoming the President of the Fourth Chamber of the Supreme Court of Spain in 2020)

Svalbard and Jan Mayen (NOR) 
 Monica Hansen Nylund: First female judge to serve as the Chief Judge of the Hålogaland Court of Appeal (2017) [jurisdiction includes the island territories Svalbard and Jan Mayen]

Sweden 
 Elsa Eschelsson (1897): First female in Sweden to earn a doctorate in law. She committed suicide when she could not find employment.
 Anna Pettersson: First female (an autodidact) in Sweden to open her own law agency and practice as a legal agent (1904)
 Eva Andén and Mathilda Staël von Holstein (1918): First two female lawyers in Sweden
 Anna Bugge-Wicksell (Candidacy of Law, 1911): First female (a Norwegian-born lawyer) "member of the League of Nations' permanent mandate commission" (1921)
 Birgit Spångberg: First female judge in Sweden (1927)
 Ingrid Gärde Widemar (1948): First female appointed as a Justice of the Supreme Court of Sweden (1968-1977)
 Hedvig Anna-Lisa Vinberg: First female to serve as a Supreme Court Counsel in Sweden (1953)
 Anne Ramberg (1976): First female lawyer to serve as the Secretary General for the Swedish Bar Association (Sveriges advokatsamfund) beginning in 2000
 Petra Lundh: First female to serve as the National Prosecutor (Prosecutor's Office) of Sweden (2018)

Switzerland 
 Emilie Kempin-Spyri (1887): First female to graduate with a law degree in Switzerland, but denied the ability to practice as an attorney
 Anna Mackenroth (1898): First female lawyer in Switzerland and Zurich, Switzerland
 Dora Labhart-Roeder: First female registered to practice law before the Federal Court of Switzerland (1923). She was also the first female lawyer in the Canton of Thurgau, Switzerland.
 Ita Maria Eisenring: First female prosecutor (1959) and Swiss cantonal judge (1979) in Switzerland
 Margrith Bigler-Eggenberger (1961): First female substitute judge (1972) and Judge of the Federal Court of Switzerland (1974)
 Anne Colliard: First female appointed as the Attorney General of Switzerland (c. 1990–2010)
 Salome Zimmermann: First female secret service judge in Switzerland (c. 2017)
 Anne Petrig: First female from Switzerland to serve as a Judge Ad Hoc at the International Tribunal for the Law of the Sea (ITLOS) (2019)
 Martha Niquille: First female to serve as the President of the Federal Supreme Court of Switzerland (2021)

Transnistria (MDA) 
 Ivanova Olga Dmitrievna and Valentina Nikolaevna Chebotar: First females to serve as the Chairperson and Deputy of the Supreme Court of the Pridnestrovskaia Moldavskaia Respublika (PMR) respectively (1992)

Ukraine 
 Elena Abramovna Halperin-Ginsburg: One of the first female lawyers in Ukraine. She was denied the right to practice law in 1909 despite passing the bar exam in Kharkiv.
 : First female to serve as a Justice of the Supreme Court of Ukraine (1988)
 Tatiana Viktorivna Varfolomeeva: First female to serve as the President of the Ukrainian Bar Association (1995)
 Lyudmila Fedorovna Malinnikova and Lyudmila Pantelievna Chubar: First females appointed as Judges of the Constitutional Court of Ukraine (1996)
 Suzanne Romanovna Stanik: First female to serve as a Deputy Chairperson of the Constitutional Court of Ukraine (2006)
 Anna Yudkovskaya: First Ukrainian female to serve as a Judge of the European Court of Human Rights (2010)
 Valentyna Danishevska (1983): First female justice to serve as the Chief Justice of the Supreme Court of Ukraine (2017)
 Natalia Shaptala: First female to serve as the President of the Constitutional Court of Ukraine (2019)
 Iryna Venediktova: First female to serve as the Prosecutor General of Ukraine (2020)

United Kingdom 
 Eliza Orme: First female to earn a law degree in England (1888). She was not called to the English Bar until later in the 1920s after the first female pioneers.
 Letitia Alice Walkington: First female to graduate with a degree of Bachelor of Laws in Great Britain or Ireland (1889) [United Kingdom]
 Eveline MacLaren and Josephine Gordon Stuart (1909): First female law graduates in Scotland. They both obtained an LLB degree from the Faculty of Law at Edinburgh Law School.
 Emily Duncan: First female Justice of the Peace in England (1912)
 Dorothy Bonarjee: First female (who was of Indian descent) to earn a law degree from the University College London (1917)
 Madge Easton Anderson (1920): First female solicitor in the United Kingdom (upon being admitted to practice law in Scotland)
 Ada Summers: First female to officially become a Justice of the Peace (magistrate) in the United Kingdom (England; 1920)
 Helena Normanton (1922): First female barrister in the United Kingdom (upon being called to the Bar of England and Wales). She and Rose Heilbron became the first female King's Counsels in 1949.
 Carrie Morrison (1922): First female solicitor in England
 Ivy Williams (1922): First female barrister called to the Bar of England and Wales. Although she was admitted the same year as Helena Normanton, Williams opted to teach law rather than practice as a barrister.
 Margaret Kidd (1923): First female member admitted to the Scottish Bar
 Agnes Twiston Hughes (1923): First female solicitor in Wales
 Maria Alice Phillips (née Westell) (1923): First Jewish female barrister in England and Wales
 Kathleen Hoahing (1927): First female to qualify as a solicitor in Britain. She would relocate soon afterwards to China.
 Sybil Campbell (1922): First female judge (appointed as a magistrate) in England (1945)
 Sheelagh Murnaghan (1947): First female barrister in Northern Ireland
 Elizabeth Lane (1940): First female appointed as a Judge of the County Court (1962) and Judge of the High Court (1965) in England
 Rose Heilbron (1939): First female appointed as a Judge of the Central Criminal Court of England and Wales (Old Bailey) (1972) [England]
 Eilis McDermott (1974): First female lawyer to become a Queen's Counsel (QC) in Northern Ireland
 Corinne Philpott (1977): First female judge in Northern Ireland (upon her appointment as a County Court Judge in 1998)
 Harriet Harman (c. 1978): First female appointed as the Solicitor-General of England and Wales (2001)
 Elish Angiolini (1983): First female lawyer to become the Solicitor General for Scotland (2001) and Lord Advocate of Scotland (2006)
 Hazel Cosgrove, Lady Cosgrove (c. 1966): First female judge in Scotland (2003)
 June Venters: First female solicitor to become Queen's Counsel (QC) in England and Wales (2006)
 Patricia Scotland (1977): First female appointed as the Attorney General of England, Wales and Northern Ireland (2007) 
 Brenda Marjorie Hale (1969): First female appointed as a Justice of the Supreme Court of the United Kingdom (2009) and serve as its President (2017). She was also the first female to become a Law Lord in the House of Lords of the United Kingdom of Great Britain and Northern Ireland (2004). 
 Denise McBride (1988) and Siobhan Keegan (1993): First females appointed as Judges of the High Court of Justice in Northern Ireland (2015)
 Siobhan Keegan (1993): First female Chief Justice of the High Court of Justice in Northern Ireland (2021)

Vatican City (Holy See)
 Silvia Monica Correale: First female lawyer in Vatican City
 Maria Voce: First female lawyer in Holy See
 Catia Summaria: First female Prosecutor at the Vatican Court of Appeals (2021)

See also 
 Justice ministry
 List of first women lawyers and judges by nationality
 List of first women lawyers and judges in Africa
 List of first women lawyers and judges in Asia
 List of first women lawyers and judges in North America
 List of first women lawyers and judges in Oceania
 List of first women lawyers and judges in South America
 List of first women lawyers and judges in the United States
 List of the first women holders of political offices in Europe

References 

Women, Europe
Europe, lawyers
Women, lawyers
Women in Europe